Elstree 1976 is a 2015 documentary film about the making of the 1977 film Star Wars and the legacy that it left behind.

Cast
 Paul Blake
 Jeremy Bulloch
 Garrick Hagon
 Anthony Forrest
 David Prowse
 Angus MacInnes, who played Jon "Dutch" Vander (Gold Leader)
 Pam Rose
 Derek Lyons
 Laurie Goode
 John Chapman

Production
The film was successfully funded via Kickstarter, grossing £42,191.  The first trailer was released on 29 October 2015. It played at the BFI London Film Festival The premiere was attended by 400 people.

Reception
The film received mixed reviews. Screen Daily said, "While the quirky outcome falls short of that ambition, it offers a slice of enjoyable nostalgia, capturing a sense of life as silly, surprising, regretful and all too fleeting." The Hollywood Reporter said, "for anyone expecting a definitive behind-the-scenes film about the making of Star Wars, this is not the documentary you have been looking for." The Village Voice said, "The most interesting part of Elstree 1976 comes when these actors express ambivalence about their odd celebrity." The review aggregator website Rotten Tomatoes reports that 81% of critics gave the film a positive rating, based on 27 reviews, with an average score of 6.37/10.

References

External links
 
 
  at www.sci-fi-online.com

2015 films
2015 documentary films
Star Wars documentaries
Documentary films about films
Kickstarter-funded documentaries
2010s English-language films